Peisistratus was a tyrant of Athens, Greece, three different times between 561 and 528 BC.

Peisistratus, Peisistratos or Pisistratus may also refer to:
 Peisistratus (Odyssey), son of Nestor who appears in The Odyssey
 Peisistratos of Lapithos, 4th century BC
 Peisistratus of Orchomenus, king of Arcadian Orchomenus during the Peloponnesian War
 Pisistratus the Younger, r. 522–521 BC, an annual archon of Athens